Fabio Golombek is a Brazilian-American producer and director. In 2015 he is president of FJ Productions, which he founded in 2002. He has also been the senior producer of the award-winning show Planeta Brasil (TV Globo International) since 2003.

Early life and education

Fabio earned a B.S. in Mechanical Engineering from FAAP, a master's degree in Radio and TV from San Diego State University and a B.A. in Social Communications (Cinema Studies) from the School of Arts and Communications at the University of Sao Paulo, in Brazil.

Career
In 1983, after graduating from college, Golombek worked as assistant director on soap operas at Rede Bandeirantes TV. Later he was a director at JPO Productions, working on a number of programs produced for local networks. He moved to Los Angeles in 1990, and worked on a number of feature films such as Star Time, Killer Tomatoes Eat France, People Under the Stairs. In 1995 he co-founded Pacific Factory Entertainment and start to work with sports channels in the US (ESPN and ABC) and Brazil (SBT and Record TV), producing the IndyCar series, World Cup of Soccer and the Olympic Games, aside from several magazine format shows such as Shape Up (Fox Sports), Zona Zen (Sportv), Road to the Olympics (Directv) and others.

In 2002 Golombek founded FJ Productions to focus on entertainment shows and scripted programming. He produced the shows Shape Up (Fox Latin), Shop the World (SCG), Zen Zone (Sportv) and Hollywood News in 3D (Sky and Orange). After 2010, he produced Bed and Breakfast (Marcio Garcia dir.) which is distributed by PlayArt and Green Apple starring Dean Cain and Juliana Paes, Man Camp (Brian Brightly dir.) distributed by H2O and VMI with Mariel Hemingway, Dean Cain and Fernanda Machado. He also co-produced Open Road (Marcio Garcia dir.) distributed by Universal Pictures with Camilla Belle, Andy Garcia and Juliette Lewis.

Golombek later produced Like Sunday, Like Rain (written and directed by Frank Whaley) with Leighton Meester, Debra Messing and Billie Joe Armstrong which is distributed by Monterey and VMI) and which premiered at the Raindance Film Festival; Experimenter (Michael Almereyda dir.) that premiered  at the Sundance Film Festival (2015) with Peter Sarsgaard and Winona Ryder distributed by Magnolia; and Bleiberg and Breaking Through (written and directed by John Swetnam) and distributed by Voltage and Xlrator.

In 2015 Golombek continues to act as president of FJ Productionsm where he is working on the development of feature films and documentaries and coordinates The Hollywood News Report TV (HBO and syndication), As Últimas de Hollywood and Sonywood News (Sony Entertainment), Hollywood Buzz (TNT) and Hollywood Uncut (Globosat +).

Golombek is a member of the Producers Guild of America (PGA), IDA and NALIP.

Filmography

TV

References

External links

FJ Productions website

Year of birth missing (living people)
Living people